Hispidella is a genus of flowering plants in the family Asteraceae. The genus is monotypic with only one known species, Hispidella hispanica, native to the Iberian Peninsula (Portugal and Spain).

References

Monotypic Asteraceae genera
Flora of Spain
Flora of Portugal
Cichorieae
Endemic flora of the Iberian Peninsula